Association football while being included in the 1956 Spartakiad of the Peoples of the USSR was not a regular event at Spartakiads until 1979.

The inaugural tournament was conducted in preparation for the football tournament at the 1956 Summer Olympics. The competition involved many experienced players of the Soviet Top League. 

It was resumed only after over 20 years as a competition for preparation for the football tournament at the 1980 Summer Olympics and throughout the 1980s became a regular event of the Spartakiad. However the football tournament was not conducted at the 1990 Spartakiad of Peoples of the USSR and never resumed again.

Records

Key:
aet – after extra time
asdet – after sudden death extra time

Medal table

See also
 Commonwealth of Independent States Cup

References

External links
 Spartakiads at RSSSF

 
Spartakiads of Peoples of the USSR
Sports at the Spartakiad of the Peoples of the USSR
Defunct football competitions in the Soviet Union
Youth football competitions
1956 establishments in the Soviet Union
1986 disestablishments in the Soviet Union